= Hamdiu & Shyhretja =

- Genre: Comedy
- Written by: Besart Sllamniku
- Directed by: Genc Berisha
- Starring: Besart Sllamniku; Edona Reshitaj
- Country of origin: Kosovo
- Original language: Albanian
- No. of seasons: 3
- No. of episodes: 45

Production
- Cinematography: Bujar Ahmeti
- Editors: Besart Sllamniku; Gazmend Zhubi; Fitim Hajdari
- Camera setup: Gazmend Zhubi; Gëzim Rexhepi; Genc Berisha; Fitim Hajdari; Verdi Berisha
- Running time: 4-6 minutes
- Production company: GjirafaStudios

Original release
- Network: GjirafaVideo
- Release: January 10, 2018 – present

Hamdiu & Shyhretja (alternatively Hamdiu dhe Shyhretja) is a Kosovar comedy web series directed by Genc Berisha, produced by GjirafaStudios, starring Besart Sllamniku and Edona Reshitaj as the title characters.

The first season premiered on January 10, 2018, on GjirafaVideo at 10:00 pm. The episodes were released all at once. The second season premiered in March 2018, while the third season premiered on September of the same year.

== Overview ==
The series deals with the bizarre relationship between an Albanian married couple, Hamdiu and Shyhretja, with themes of love, jealousy, cheating, intrigue, and manipulation.

== Cast ==
=== Main ===
- Besart Sllamniku as Hamdiu
- Edona Reshitaj as Shyhretja

=== Others ===
- Granit Ukaj
- Ftesa Hazrolli
- Vullkan Gacaferri
- Yllëza Mazrekaj
- Flamur Ahmeti
- Leunorë Makolli
- Arbnora Makolli
- Gëzim Rexhepi
- Veton Berisha
- Fitim Hajdari
- Agan Asllani
- Arjanit Hoti
- Verona Koxha
- Molikë Maxhuni
- Agron Demolli
- Anila Krasniqi
- Blend Sadiku
- Adele Gjoka
- Verdi Berisha

=== Guests ===
- Baby G
- Ana Kabashi

== Episodes ==
Season	Episodes	Originally aired	Platform
1	14	January 10, 2018	GjirafaVideo
2	16	March 10, 2018	GjirafaVideo
3	15	September 2, 2018	GjirafaVideo
